Dahej railway station is a railway station on the Western Railway network in the state of Gujarat, India. Dahej railway station is 62 km far away from Bharuch Junction railway station. One MEMU train starts from here.

Trains
 Dahej - Bharuch MEMU

See also
 Bharuch district

References

Railway stations in Bharuch district
Vadodara railway division